United States gubernatorial elections were held in 1887, in six states.

Kentucky and Maryland held their gubernatorial elections in odd numbered years, every 4 years, preceding the United States presidential election year. Massachusetts and Rhode Island both elected its governors to a single-year term, which they would abandon in 1920 and 1912, respectively. Iowa and Ohio at this time held gubernatorial elections in every odd numbered year.

Results

References

Notes

Bibliography 
 
 
 
 

 
November 1887 events